= Stuart Kleinfelder =

American electrical engineer

Stuart Kleinfelder from the University of California, Irvine was named Fellow of the Institute of Electrical and Electronics Engineers (IEEE) in 2016 for contributions to sensors and instrumentation for high-speed imaging applications.
